Elizabeth Washington Foote Cheves was an American writer of prose and verse.

Born Elizabeth Washington Foote, Cheves was a native of eastern Virginia. The fourth child of Richard Foote and Helen Gibbon Stuart; of Cornish extraction, she was named for an aunt of her father's, a friend of George Washington and owner and resident of Hayfield in Fairfax County, Virginia. When she was five, her mother died; her father remarried, but his second wife, too, died. Consequently, much of her education was left to her father to arrange. Initially instructed by a tutor, at the age of twelve she began instructing herself in further subjects to which she had yet to be introduced. She studied drawing, painting, Latin, and French, and began to write poetry. In 1830 she married physician F. Thornton Cheves, a native of Caroline County, Virginia; at his death in 1844 she was left with little money to support herself and her children. Consequently, in 1849 she published a volume of Sketches in Prose and Verse. The book bears a dedication to Zachary Taylor.

References

Year of birth missing
Year of death missing
19th-century American women writers
19th-century American poets
American women poets
19th-century American non-fiction writers
American women non-fiction writers
Poets from Virginia